James Anthony Sullivan (August 13, 1940 – disappeared March 6, 1975) was an American singer-songwriter and guitarist who released two albums before he disappeared without a trace in New Mexico.

Life
Sullivan grew up in the Linda Vista area of San Diego, California, where his Irish-American parents had moved from Nebraska to work in the defense industry. He was 6'2 and a high school quarterback. According to self-written liner notes on his first LP, he "grew up in a government housing project with a bunch of other Okies and Arkies," and decided to play music after listening to local blues groups. He married, and played guitar in a local rock band, the Survivors, with his sister-in-law Kathie Doran. He and a friend bought a bar near to their college, but it lost money, and in 1968 he moved with his wife Barbara and young son to Los Angeles.

While his wife worked at Capitol Records, Sullivan wrote songs and performed in increasingly prestigious clubs in the Los Angeles area. In particular, he became established at the Raft club in Malibu, where he became friends with Hollywood figures including Lee Majors, Lee Marvin, and Harry Dean Stanton. He appeared as an extra in the movie Easy Rider, and performed on the José Feliciano television show. His friends contributed the funding that allowed him to record an album of his songs with leading Los Angeles session musicians, keyboard player Don Randi, drummer Earl Palmer, and bass player Jimmy Bond, who was also the record's arranger and co-record producer. After Nick Venet at Capitol turned down the opportunity to release the record, it was issued by Sullivan's friend Al Dobbs on a small record label, Monnie, a label he set up for that purpose. The album, U.F.O., was released in 1969, and featured Sullivan's songs in a style blending folk, rock and country that has been compared with Fred Neil, Tim Hardin, Gene Clark and Joe South, with arrangements in the style of David Axelrod.

The album was remixed and reissued by Century City Records in 1970, and the track "Rosey" was issued as a single, but they made little impact at the time. Sullivan continued to perform in clubs, and he re-recorded the UFO song "Highway" for RCA Records as a promotional single, but no contract resulted. He also recorded the opening/closing theme song from Pat Williams, I Do What I Please, from the 1971 box office hit, Evel Knievel, but limited promotion of the single failed to yield sales. In 1972, he recorded a second album, Jim Sullivan, arranged by Jim Hughart, produced by Lee Burch and released by Playboy Records. Again, however, the record was unsuccessful. Sullivan's career problems led him increasingly to alcohol and his marriage began to fail, despite the birth of a second child in 1972.  In 1975 he decided to travel to Nashville, where Kathie Doran was working as a singer and songwriter, and try to find success there.

Disappearance

Sullivan left Los Angeles on March 4, 1975, to drive to Nashville alone in his Volkswagen Beetle. The next day, after being cautioned by a highway patrol officer regarding his driving, he checked into the La Mesa Motel in Santa Rosa, New Mexico. Later reports suggest he did not sleep there, and left his key inside the room, and that he bought vodka at the town store. His car was later found abandoned at the ranch, and he was reportedly last seen walking away from it. The car contained Sullivan's money, papers, guitar, clothes, and a box of his unsold records.<ref name=allmusicufo>[http://www.allmusic.com/album/ufo-mw0002053150  James Allen, Review of U.F.O., Allmusic.com]. Retrieved October 14, 2015</ref>

He was never seen again, and reports have variously attributed his disappearance to being murdered, becoming disoriented and lost, becoming lost on purpose to end his life, or, particularly from conspiracy theorists and in light of the title of his first album named U.F.O., alien abduction. Search parties failed to find any trace of him. A decomposed body resembling Sullivan was later found in a remote area several miles away, but was determined not to be his.

Sullivan's daughter Jamie died in 1988, and his wife Barbara died in 2016.

Legacy
Sullivan's records, especially U.F.O., developed a cult following in later years, partly because of their rarity and obscurity.  In 2010, Matt Sullivan (no relation), the founder of Light in the Attic Records, decided to reissue U.F.O., and made serious attempts to uncover the mystery of Sullivan's disappearance, interviewing many of those who knew him and those involved in his recordings, but revealing little new information. The album was issued on CD in 2011. The release of the album and the resulting media coverage sparked new interest in Sullivan and his work.

A collection of previously unreleased demos by Sullivan, If the Evening Were Dawn, was released in 2019 by Light in the Attic Records.  Both of Sullivan's previous albums were also reissued at this time.

Discography

Albums
 U.F.O. (Monnie, 1969)
 LP reissue (Century City, 1970)
 CD/LP reissue (Light in the Attic, 2011)
 LP reissue (Vinyl Me, Please, with Light in the Attic, September 2019)
 Jim Sullivan (Playboy, 1972)
 If the Evening Were Dawn'' (Light in the Attic, 2019) - compilation of unreleased material recorded from 1969-1972

Singles
 "Rosey" / "Roll Back the Time" (Century City, 1970)
"Highway" / "Lorelei Lee" (RCA, 1971) (promotional only)

See also
List of people who disappeared mysteriously: 1910–1990

References

External links
 
 The Jim Sullivan Story, video
  Liner notes, U.F.O. reissue
  "Man On A Mission, Or: How A Light In The Attic Release Gets Made", Light in the Attic Records 

1940 births
1970s missing person cases
20th-century American singers
20th-century American male singers
American male singer-songwriters
American people of Irish descent
Missing person cases in New Mexico
Musicians from San Diego
People declared dead in absentia
Singer-songwriters from California